Epithemis mariae is a species of dragonfly in the family Libellulidae known commonly as the rubytailed hawklet. It is endemic to the Western Ghats, India. The species is found in small colonies closely associated with forested marshes.

Description and habitat
It is a small dragonfly having black pro-thorax and thorax with a broad greenish yellow humeral stripe on either side. Segments 1-3 of the abdomen are brick-red, the remaining segments are black; segments 4-7 have a basal yellow ring. Female is golden yellow with black markings. 

This species occurs in small colonies in bogs at the foot of the hills where it breeds.

See also 
 List of odonates of India
 List of odonata of Kerala

References

Libellulidae
Endemic fauna of the Western Ghats